Bailey is an English or Scottish surname. It is first recorded in Northumberland, where it was said to have been changed from Balliol due to the unpopularity  of Scottish king John Balliol (d. 1314). There appears to be no historical evidence for this, and Bain concludes that the earliest form was Baillie or Bailli (recorded in the early 14th century).
The origin of the name is most likely from Anglo-Norman bailli, the equivalent of bailiff; bailie remains a regional Scottish variant of the term bailiff.
Alternatively, it has been suggested that the Norman name may have been locational, derived from Bailleul-En-Vimeu in Normandy.

A
Aaron Bailey (disambiguation), multiple people
Aaron Bailey (American football) (born 1971), American football player
Abe Bailey (1864–1940), South African diamond tycoon, politician, financier and cricketer
Ace Bailey (1903–1992), Canadian ice hockey player
Adrian Bailey (born 1945), British politician
 Sir Alan Bailey (born 1931), British civil servant
Albert Bailey (disambiguation), multiple people
Albert Bailey (cricketer) (1872–1950), English cricketer whose name may have been Alfred
Albert Bailey (rugby league), English rugby league footballer of the 1930s
Bert Bailey (politician) (1915–1999), Australian politician
Aleen Bailey (born 1980), Jamaican athlete
Alexander Bailey (disambiguation), multiple people
Alfred Marshall Bailey (1894–1978), American ornithologist and museum director
Alfred Bailey (disambiguation), multiple people
Alfred Bailey (poet) (1905–1997), Canadian academic and poet
Alice Bailey (1880–1949), British theosophist
Alison Bailey, New Zealand academic
Alison Bailey, American academic
Allen Bailey (born 1989), American footballer
Alvin Bailey (born 1991), American footballer
Amari Bailey (born 2004), American basketball player
Andrew Bailey (disambiguation), multiple people
Andrew Bailey (banker) (born 1959), British banker
Andrew Bailey (baseball) (born 1984), American baseball pitcher
Angela Bailey (1962–2021), Canadian athlete
Anne Bailey (1742–1825), British-born American frontier scout
Anne Howard Bailey (1924–2006), American writer
Anne Bailey (ten-pin bowling) (born 1951), British ten-pin bowler
Anthony Bailey (author) (1933–2020), English author
Anthony Bailey (PR advisor) (born 1970), Irish-British-Antiguan campaigner and PR consultant
Arthur Bailey (disambiguation), multiple people

B
Barbara B. Kennelly, née Barbara Bailey (born 1936), American politician
Barbara Bailey (artist), née Barbara Bailey (1910–2003), English canoness and illustrator
Barbara Bailey (politician) (born 19??), American politician in Washington State
Ben, Benjamin and Benny Bailey (disambiguation), multiple people
Ben Bailey (born 1970), American comedian
Benjamin Bailey (missionary) (1791–1871), British missionary in India
Benjamin Franklin Bailey (1875–1944), American electrical engineer
Benny Bailey (1925–2005), American jazz trumpeter
Benjamin H. Bailey (1829–1919), American Unitarian minister
Bert Bailey (1868–1953), New Zealand writer and actor
Bill and Billy Bailey (disambiguation), multiple people
Bill Bailey (outfielder) (1881–1967), Major League Baseball outfielder
Bill Bailey (pitcher) (1888–1926), Major League Baseball pitcher
Bill Bailey (Spanish Civil War veteran) (1911–1995), Irish-American labor activist
Bill Bailey (dancer) (1912–1978), American tap dancer and moonwalk pioneer
Bill Bailey (American football) (1916–1990), American football player
Bill Bailey (surfer) (1933–2009), known as "the father of British surfing"
Bill Bailey (Indiana politician) (born 1948), American businessman and politician
Bill Bailey (born 1965), British comedian, musician, actor, TV and radio presenter and author
Bill Bailey (American actor) (born 19??), American actor and author
Billy Bailey (Gunfight at Hide Park) (died 1871), lawman who was murdered
Billy Bailey (1947–1996), American executed for murder
Billy Wayne Bailey (born 1957), former Democratic member of the West Virginia Senate
Bob Bailey (disambiguation), multiple people
Bob Bailey (actor) (1913–1983), American radio actor
Bob Bailey (ice hockey) (1931–2003), Canadian ice hockey player
Bob Bailey (baseball) (1942–2018), American third baseman in Major League Baseball
Bob Bailey (politician) (born 1951), Canadian: member of the Ontario legislature
Bob Bailey (rugby league), former New Zealand rugby league player and coach
Boss Bailey (born 1979), American football player
Bret Bailey (born 1964), Australian rules footballer
Brett Bailey (born 1967), South African playwright, director and artist
Brian Bailey (born 19??), Canadian fashion designer
Bruce M. Bailey (born 1935), American author and humorist
Buck Bailey (1896–1964), American baseball coach
Buddy Bailey (born 1957), American baseball manager
Bunty Bailey (born 1964), English model, dancer and actress
Buster Bailey (1902–1967), American jazz clarinettist
Byron Bailey (1930–1998), US American and Canadian footballer

C
Caleb Bailey (1898–1957), American Marine Corps officer, pilot and athlete
 Calvin Bailey (born 1994) United States Marine Corps engineer
Cameron Bailey (born 19??), Canadian film critic and festival programmer
Candace Bailey (born 1982), American actress
Carey Bailey (born 1969), American football player and coach
Carl Bailey (born 1958), American basketball player
Carl E. Bailey (1894–1948), American politician, 31st Governor of Arkansas
Carlton Bailey (born 1964), American football linebacker
Carolyn Sherwin Bailey (1875–1961), American author of children's stories
Catherine Bailey (disambiguation), multiple people
Catherine Hayes Bailey (1921–2014), American plant geneticist
Champ Bailey (born 1978), American football player
Charles and Charlie Bailey (disambiguation), multiple people
Charles Justin Bailey (1859–1946), American soldier
Charles Bailey (medium) (1870–1947), Australian apport medium
Charles P. Bailey (surgeon) (1910–1993), American pioneer in heart surgery
Charles W. Bailey II (1929–2012), American journalist, newspaper editor and novelist
Charlie Bailey (American football) (born 1940), former American football coach
Charles R. Bailey (born 19??), American Army chaplain
Charles G. Bailey (born 196?), faculty manager of WMUL, Marshall University
Chip Bailey (1921–1963), New Zealand trade unionist
Chloe Bailey (born 1998), American actress and singer-songwriter (of Chloe x Halle)
Chris and Christopher Bailey (disambiguation), multiple people
Chris Bailey (musician, born 1950), member of the rock bands The Angels and Gang Gajang
Chris Bailey (musician, born 1956), co-founder and singer of rock band The Saints
Chris Bailey (artist) (born 1965) New Zealand Māori carver and sculptor
Chris Bailey (tennis) (born 1968), English tennis player, TV sports commentator and property consultant
Chris Bailey (ice hockey) (born 1972), American ice hockey player
Chris Bailey (rugby league) (born 1982), Australian rugby league player
Chris Bailey (animator) (born 19??), American animator
Christopher Bailey (fashion designer) (born 1971), English fashion executive
Christopher Bailey (screenwriter) (born 19??), British lecturer and Doctor Who screenwriter
Cindy-Lu Bailey (born 1965), Australian deaf swimmer and the most decorated woman in Deaflympics history 
Clarence Bailey (1963–2006), American football player
 Clifton George Bailey III (born 1967), Jamaican reggae artist known as Capleton
Colin Bailey (drummer) (1934–2021), British-born American jazz drummer
Colin B. Bailey (born 19??), British museum director
Corinne Bailey Rae (born 1979), British singer
Cory Bailey (born 1971), American baseball pitcher
Cullen Bailey (born 1985), Australian cricketer

D
D. R. Shackleton Bailey (1917–2005), British classical scholar
Dan, Daniel and Danny Bailey (disambiguation), multiple people
Dan Bailey (conservationist) (1904–1982), American conservationist
Dan Bailey (American football) (born 1988), American football placekicker
Daniel A. Bailey (1894–1970), American politician in Pennsylvania
Daniel Bailey (born 1986), sprinter from Antigua and Barbuda
Danny Bailey (born 1964), English footballer
 Darrell Bailey, basketball fan known as Clipper Darrell
Dave or David Bailey (disambiguation), multiple people
Dave Bailey (musician) (born 1926), American jazz drummer
Dave Bailey (athlete) (1945–2022), Canadian track and field athlete
David Bailey (militia officer), American militia officer in the Illinois Militia
David Jackson Bailey (1812–1897), American politician
David Bailey (diplomat) (1830–1896), American politician and diplomat to China
David Bailey (actor) (1933–2004), American actor
David Bailey (born 1938), English fashion and portrait photographer
David Bailey (cricketer, born 1943), English cricketer
David Bailey (cricketer, born 1944), English cricketer
David H. Bailey (mathematician) (born 1948), American mathematician
David Bailey (motocross) (born 1961), American racer
David A. Bailey (born 1961), British Afro-Caribbean curator, photographer and writer
David M. Bailey (1966–2010), American Christian singer-songwriter
David Bailey (economist) (born 1966), British academic and commentator
David Bailey (rugby league) (born 1969), New Zealand rugby league footballer
David Bailey (basketball) (born 1981), American basketball player
David Bailey (writer) (born 19??), British editor and science fiction author
Dawayne Bailey (born 19??), American guitarist
Dean Bailey (1967–2014), Australian rules football player and coach
DeFord Bailey (1899–1982), American country musician
Dennis Bailey (disambiguation), multiple people
Dennis Bailey (footballer born 1935), English association football player
Dennis Bailey (footballer born 1965), English association football player
Dennis Bailey (rugby league), British rugby league footballer of the 1990s
Derek Bailey (guitarist) (1930–2005), British guitarist
Derek Bailey (tribal chairman) (born 1972), Native American tribal chairman and US Congressional candidate
Dermot Bailey (born 1994), British professional wheelchair tennis player
Derrick Bailey (1918–2005), British cricketer and aviation entrepreneur
Derrick Sherwin Bailey (1910–1984), British theologian
Dion Bailey (born 1992), American football safety
Dona Bailey (born 19??), American computer game designer
Donald Bailey (disambiguation), multiple people
 Sir Donald Bailey (civil engineer) (1901–1985), British civil engineer
Donald Bailey (musician) (1934–2013), American jazz drummer
Donald A. Bailey (1945–2020), American politician and lawyer
Donald Bailey (architect) (born ????), Australian architect
Donovan Bailey (born 1967), Jamaican-Canadian athlete
Dot Bailey (born 19??), New Zealand cricketer
Doug Bailey (1933–2013), American political consultant
Doug Bailey (footballer), Australian rules football

E
Ed Bailey (1931–2007), American baseball player
Edward Bailey (1814–1903), American missionary and painter
Edward Battersby Bailey (1881–1965), English geologist
Edwin Bailey (born 1959), American gridiron football player
Edwin C. Bailey (1816–1890), American newspaper editor and postmaster
Eion Bailey (born 1976), American actor
Elisabeth Tova Bailey, American writer
Elizabeth Bailey (1938–2022), American economist
Ellene Alice Bailey (1853–1897), American inventor and designer
Elles Bailey, English blues rock singer, songwriter, and pianist
Emma Bailey (died 1999), first American woman auctioneer
 Erastus Michael Bailey, American singer-songwriter better known as Razzy Bailey
Eric Bailey (disambiguation), multiple people
Eric Bailey (politician) (1905–1989), British Conservative Member of Parliament
Eric Bailey (GC) (1906–1946), Australian recipient of the George Cross
Eric Bailey (basketball) (born 1960), Australian basketball player
Eric Bailey (American football) (born 1963), American football player
Everett Russell Bailey (1888–1932), American physician

F
F. Lee Bailey (1933–2021), American attorney
Florence Merriam Bailey (1863–1948), American ornithologist
Fran Bailey (born 1946), Australian politician
Frank Bailey (disambiguation), multiple people
Frank Bailey (financier) (1865–1953), New York businessman and philanthropist
Frank Bailey (footballer, born 1800s) (fl. 1901–1902), English footballer
Frank Bailey (footballer, born 1907) (1907–1969), English footballer
Frank I. Bailey Jr. (born 1936), American politician
Frank Bailey (author) (born 1970), former aide to then Alaska governor Sarah Palin, and author
Fred and Frederick Bailey (disambiguation), multiple people
Fred Bailey (1895–1972), American baseball player
Frederick Manson Bailey (1827–1915), Australian botanist
Frederick Marshman Bailey (1882–1967), known as Eric, British Intelligence officer and explorer
Frederick Bailey (cricketer) (1919–1985), English cricketer

G
G. W. Bailey (born 1944), American actor
Gamaliel Bailey (1807–1859), American journalist
Garnet Bailey (1948–2001), Canadian hockey player
Gary Bailey (born 1958), English footballer
Gene Bailey (1893–1973), American baseball player
Geoff Bailey (born 19??), British archaeologist
Geoffrey Bailey (1899–19??), British WWI flying ace
George Bailey (disambiguation), multiple people
George Bailey (cricketer, born 1853) (1853–1926), Australian cricketer
George Edwin Bailey (1879–1965), British electrical engineer and industrialist
George Bailey (racing driver) (1900–1940), American racecar driver
George Bailey (athlete) (1906–2000), English steeplechase runner
George Bailey (footballer) (1919–1998), Australian rules footballer for Carlton and Perth
George Bailey (cricketer, born 1982) (born 1982), Australian cricketer
Gerald Bailey (1903–1975), British politician
Gillian Bailey (born 1955), British actress and academic
Glenda Bailey (born 1958), British journalist
Graeme Bailey (born 1943), Australian racing driver
Graham Bailey (born 1920), English footballer
Guy Bailey (born 1950), American educator

H
H. B. Bailey (1936–2003), American racing driver
H. C. Bailey (1878–1961), British writer
H. E. Bailey (died 1976), Oklahoma politician
Hachaliah Bailey (1775–1845), American circusman
Halle Bailey (born 2000), American actress and singer-songwriter (of Chloe x Halle)
Harold Walter Bailey (1899–1996), English linguistic scholar
Harold Bailey (gridiron football) (born 1957), American football player
Harry Bailey (footballer) (1919–1996), footballer for Leicester Fosse
Harry Bailey (1922–1985), Australian psychiatrist
Harvey Bailey (1887–1979), American bank robber
Hedley Bailey (1895–1968), English footballer
Helen Bailey (1965–2016), British author
Henry Bailey (disambiguation), multiple people
Henry Bailey (Canadian politician) (1818–1897), politician in Nova Scotia
Henry Bailey (Australian politician) (1876–1962), Australian politician
Henry Bailey (American football) (born 1973), American football wide receiver
Homer Bailey (born 1986), American baseball player
Horace Bailey (1881–1960), English footballer

I
Ian Bailey (disambiguation), multiple people
Ian Bailey (footballer) (born 1956), English footballer
Ian Bailey (author) (born 1959), head buyer and later financial director of Games Workshop
Ian Bailey (British Army soldier) (born 1959), Corporal in the Parachute Regiment who won the Military Medal during the Falklands War
Imogen Bailey (born 1977), Australian model
Irving Widmer Bailey (1884–1967), American botanist

J
J. A. Bailey (1930–2018), English cricketer and cricket administrator
J. Michael Bailey (born 1957), American psychologist and professor at Northwestern University
J. O. Bailey (1903–1979), American literary academic
J. R. Bailey (1932–1980), American singer-songwriter
Jack Bailey (disambiguation), multiple people
Jack Bailey (footballer, born 1901) (1901–????), English football player
Jack Bailey (actor) (1907–1980), American actor and daytime game show host
Jack Bailey (footballer, born 1921) (1921–1986), English football player
Jackson Bailey (1925–1996), American academic (Japanese language, culture and history)
Jacob Bailey (author) (1731–1808), Church of England clergyman and author
Jacob Whitman Bailey (1811–1857), American naturalist
Jake Bailey (American football) (born 1997), American football player
James Bailey (disambiguation), multiple people
James Bailey (American politician) (1801–1880), mayor of Houston, Texas
James Bailey (classical scholar) (c. 1802 – 1864), English schoolmaster
James E. Bailey (1822–1885), United States Senator from Tennessee
James Bailey (British politician) (1840–1910), British Conservative Party politician, MP 1895–1906
James Montgomery Bailey (1841–1894), American journalist
James Anthony Bailey (1847–1906), co-founder of Ringling Brothers and Barnum and Bailey Circus
James E. Bailey (Medal of Honor) (fl. 1870s) recipient during the Indian Wars
James R. A. Bailey (1919–2000), founder and original editor of Drum magazine
James Bailey (basketball) (born 1957), American Basketball player
James Bailey (rugby union) (born 1983), English rugby union footballer for Gloucester RFC
James Bailey (footballer) (born 1988), English footballer
James Thomas Bailey (born 19??), founder of ComedySportz Los Angeles
JaQuan Bailey (born 1997), American football player
Jay Bailey (1944–2001), American biochemical engineer
Jeff Bailey (born 1978), American baseball player
Jenni Murray née Jennifer Bailey, English broadcaster and writer
Jennifer Bailey (born 1996), British acrobatic gymnast
Jennings Bailey (1867–1963), U.S. federal judge
Jenny Bailey (born 1962), British politician
Jerry Bailey (born 1957), American jockey and broadcaster
Jim Bailey (disambiguation), multiple people
Jim Bailey (cricketer) (1908–1988), English cricketer
Jim Bailey (baseball) (1934–2022), American Major League Baseball pitcher
Jim Bailey (American football) (born 1948), American football player
Jim Bailey (entertainer) (1949–2015), American singer, actor, and female impressionist
Joe Bailey (ice hockey) (born 19??), Canadian ice hockey player
Joel John Bailey (born 1980), American soccer player
Joh Bailey (born 19??), Australian hairdresser
John Bailey (disambiguation), multiple people
John Bailey (minister) (1643–1697), English dissenting minister, later in life in New England
John Bailey (agriculturist) (1750–1819), English agriculturist and engraver
John Bailey (Massachusetts politician) (1786–1835), Member of the U.S. House of Representatives from Massachusetts
John Bailey Denton (1814–1893), British surveyor and civil engineer
John William Bailey (1831–1914), British miniature painter
John Mosher Bailey (1838–1916), U.S. Representative from New York
John Bailey (critic) (1864–1931), English literary critic, lecturer, and chairman of the National Trust
John Frederick Bailey (1866–1938), Australian botanist
John Bailey (New South Wales politician) (1871–1947), Australian politician
John O. Bailey (1880–1959), State supreme court justice from Oregon
John Edgar Bailey (1897–1958), Northern Irish politician
John Moran Bailey (1904–1975), United States politician, chair of the Democratic National Committee
John Bailey (British actor) (1912–1989), British screen and TV actor
John Bailey (luthier) (1931–2011), maker of fine guitars in England
John Bailey (cinematographer) (born 1942), American cinematographer
John Bailey (American actor) (1947–1994), a.k.a. Jack Baker
John Bailey (footballer, born 1950), English football player and chairman
John P. Bailey (born 1951), United States federal judge
John Bailey (Australian politician) (born 1954), Australian politician
John Bailey (footballer, born 1957), English football player
John Bailey (footballer, born 1969), English football player
John Bailey (rugby league) (born 1954), Australian rugby league footballer and coach
John Bailey (producer) (born 19??), Canadian recording engineer, producer
John Bailey (Irish politician) member of Dun Laoghaire/Rathdown County Council
Jonathan Bailey (disambiguation), multiple people
Joseph Bailey (disambiguation), multiple people
Sir Joseph Bailey, 1st Baronet (1783–1858), Welsh Member of Parliament for Worcester and Breconshire
Joseph Bailey (congressman) (1810–1885), U.S. Representative from Pennsylvania
Joseph Bailey (Sudbury MP) (1812–1850), British MP
Joseph Bailey (general) (1825–1867), American Civil War general
Joseph M. Bailey (1833–1895), American jurist and politician
Joseph Bailey, 1st Baron Glanusk (1840–1906), British MP and Lord
Joseph Weldon Bailey (1862–1929), United States Congressman and Senator from Texas
Joseph Weldon Bailey Jr. (1892–1943), Congressman from Texas and son of Joseph Weldon Bailey
Joseph Bailey (cricketer) (born 1942), Bermudian cricketer
Joseph Bailey (author) (born 19??), American author and psychologist 
Josh Bailey (born 1989), Canadian hockey player, NY Islanders
Josiah Bailey (1873–1946), American politician
Judith Bailey (academic) (born 1946), American university president
Judith Bailey (composer) (born 1941), Cornish composer and conductor
Judy Bailey (born 1953), New Zealand television personality
Julian Bailey (racing driver) (born 1961), British racing driver
Julian Bailey (actor) (born 1977), Canadian actor
Julian Bailey (rugby league) (born 1978), Australian rugby league footballer
Julie Bailey (born 19??), British campaigner against poor NHS hospital care
Justin Bailey (born 1995), American ice hockey forward

K
Kate Bailey (born 1982), Australian Paralympic swimmer
 Kathryn Ann Bailey (born 1943) American politician known as Kay Bailey Hutchison
Keith Bailey (cricketer) (born 1964), Irish cricketer
Keith Bailey (soccer)
Kelly Bailey (composer) (born 19??), New Zealand composer and game designer
Kenneth Bailey (disambiguation), multiple people
Kenneth Bailey (lawyer) (1898–1972), Australian public servant
Kenneth D. Bailey (1910–1942), US Marines officer
Kenneth D. Bailey (sociologist) (born 1943), American sociologist
Kevin Bailey (poet) (born 1954), British poet
Kevin Bailey (politician) (born 19??), Texas state representative, 1991–2009
Kid Bailey, (dates unknown), American Mississippi Delta bluesman
Kyle Bailey (basketball) (born 1982), American basketball player

L
Laura Bailey (disambiguation), multiple people
Laura Bailey (born 1981), American voice actress
Laura Bailey (model) (born 1972), English model
Lawrence Dudley Bailey (1819–1891), Justice of the Kansas Supreme Court 
Lee Bailey (born 1972), Scottish footballer
Len Bailey (1926–1997), British automobile designer
Leonard Bailey (disambiguation), multiple people
Leonard Bailey (inventor) (1825–1905), inventor/toolmaker and patentor of the Plane (tool)
Leonard Lee Bailey (1942–2019), surgeon who transplanted heart of baboon into Baby Fae
Lepha Eliza Bailey (1845−1924), American writer and lecturer
LeRoy Bailey Jr. Senior Pastor of The First Cathedral
Levin C. Bailey (c. 1892–1952), judge of the Maryland Court of Appeals
Liam Bailey (born 1983), English musician and singer
Liberty Hyde Bailey (1858–1954), American botanist
Lowell Bailey (born 1981), American biathlete 
Lorna Bailey (born 1978), British ceramic artist
Lucy Bailey (born 19??), British theatre director
Luke Bailey (rugby league) (born 1980), Australian rugby league international
Luke Bailey (actor) (born 1984), British actor
Lydia Bailey (printer) (1779–1869), American printer
Leslie Patrick Bailey (1953-1993) Member of the "Dirty Dozen" given two whole life tariff's for the murders of Barry George Lewis and Mark Anthony Tildesley

M
Madilyn Bailey, American singer-songwriter
Madison Bailey (born 1999), American actress
Malcolm Bailey (footballer, born 1937) (1937–2016), English footballer
Malcolm Bailey (footballer, born 1950) (1950–2017), English footballer
Margaret Ann Bailey (1879–1955), Australian teacher
Margaret E. Bailey (1915–2014), the first black United States Army Nurse Corps colonel
Margaret Jewett Smith Bailey (c. 1812 – 1882) American pioneer, missionary, and author 
Marian Breland Bailey (1920–2001), American psychologist
Marion Bailey (born 1951), British actress
Mark Bailey (disambiguation), multiple people
Mark Bailey (diplomat) (1951–2021), Canadian diplomat
Mark Bailey (rugby union) (born 1960), English rugby player, headmaster and professor of Medieval History
Mark Bailey (baseball) (born 1961), American baseball catcher
Mark Bailey (conductor) (born 1962), American conductor and composer of Slavic sacred music
Mark Bailey (cricketer) (born 1970), New Zealand cricketer
Mark Bailey (footballer) (born 1976), English footballer
Mark Bailey (politician) (born 19??), Australian politician
Markus Bailey (born 1997), American football player
Martin B. Bailey (1857–1934), American politician and lawyer
Mathis Bailey (born 1981), American-Canadian novelist and fiction writer
Mat Bailey (born 1986), English footballer
Matt Bailey (born 1991), Canadian ice hockey player
Maurice Bailey (born 1981), American basketball player
Maurice and Maralyn Bailey, World Record for longest time adrift at Sea (117 days)
Max Bailey (born 1986), Australian rules footballer
McKinley Bailey (born 19??), Iowan politician
Michael and Mike Bailey (disambiguation), multiple people
Michael Buckworth Bailey (1827–1899)), British Anglican missionary to Japan
Michael Bailey (cricketer) (born 1954), retired English cricketer
Michael Bailey (environmentalist) (born 1954), Canadian member of Greenpeace Foundation
Michael Bailey (Canadian football) (born 1982), Canadian footballer for the Toronto Argonauts
Michael Bailey (businessman) (born 19??), British CEO of Compass Group
Mike Bailey (footballer) (born 1942), English footballer
Mike Bailey (actor) (born 1988), English actor
Mike Bailey (weatherman), Australian radio presenter and politician
Mildred Bailey (1907–1951), American singer
Millie Bailey (1918–2022), American WWII veteran, civil servant, and volunteer

N
Nancy Bailey (1863–1913), UK indexer of Hansard and The Times
Nat Bailey (1902–1978), Canadian restaurateur
Nathan Bailey (died 1742), English lexicographer
Neil Bailey (born 1958), English football player, coach and assistant manager
Nellah Massey Bailey (1893–1956), American politician and librarian
Nicholas Bailey (born 1971), British actor
Nick Bailey (musician) (born 19??), American guitarist and songwriter
Nicky Bailey (born 1984), English footballer
Norma Bailey (born 1949), Canadian film director
Norman Bailey (disambiguation), multiple people
Norman Bailey (footballer) (1857–1923)
Norman Bailey (musician) (1913–1984), American musician with the Lawrence Welk orchestra
Norman Bailey (government official) (born 1931), senior staffer of the US National Security Council
Norman Bailey (bass-baritone) (1933–2021), British opera singer

O
Oakley Hoopes Bailey (1843–1947), US maker of panoramic maps
Oliver Bailey (born 1982), English cricketer

P
Patricia Bailey (born 19??), American politician found guilty of voter fraud in Illinois
Patrick Bailey (born 1985), American football linebacker
Paul Dayton Bailey (1906–1987), American writer 
Paul Bailey (disambiguation), multiple people
Pearce Bailey (1865–1922), American neurologist and psychiatrist
Pearl Bailey (1918–1990), American singer and actress
Peter Bailey (disambiguation), multiple people
Phil Bailey (born 1980), Australian rugby league player
Philip James Bailey (1816–1902), British poet
Philip Bailey (born 1951), American singer
Philip Bailey (statistician) (born 1953), British cricket statistician

Q
Quinn Bailey (born 1995), American football player

R
Ralph Emerson Bailey (1878–1948), American congressman from Missouri
Ray Bailey (1935–2012), Tasmanian politician
Raymond Bailey (1904–1980), American actor
Raymond Bailey (sportsman) (born 1944), English cricketer and footballer
Razzy Bailey (1939–2021), American singer-songwriter
Rebecca Bailey (born 1974), New Zealand Olympic road cyclist
Richard W. Bailey (1939–2011), American linguist
Richard William Bailey (1885–1957), British mechanical engineer
Rob and Robert Bailey (disambiguation), multiple people
Rob Bailey (cricketer) (born 1963), English cricketer
Rob Bailey (director) (born 19??), English television director
Rob Bailey (musician) (born 19??), Australian musician
Robert D. Bailey Sr. (1883–1963), American judge, involved in the Matewan Massacre trials
Robert L. Bailey (1892–1957), 5th Lieutenant Governor of Arkansas
Robert D. Bailey Jr. (1912–1994), American politician who served as West Virginia Secretary of State
Robert Bailey (geographer) (born 1939), American geographer
Robert E. Bailey (born 19??), U.S. Air Force Brigadier General
Robert Bailey (American football) (born 1968), American football player
Robert Bailey Jr. (born 1990), American actor
Robin Bailey (1919–1999), English actor
Robin Wayne Bailey (born 1952), American writer
Rodney Bailey (born 1979), American football defensive end
Roger Bailey (rugby league) (born 19??), New Zealand rugby league international
Roger Bailey (born 1970), American baseball player
Ron and Ronald Bailey (disambiguation), multiple people
Ron Bailey (rugby league) (1914–1989), Australian rugby league footballer of the 1930s and 1940s
Ron Bailey (politician) (1926–2015), New Zealand politician of the Labour Party
Ronald Bailey (cricketer) (1923–1990), English cricketer
Ronald Bailey (born 1953), American author and editor of books on economics, ecology and biotechnology
Rosanne Bailey (1950–2016), United States military officer
Roy Bailey (disambiguation), multiple people
Roy Bailey (politician) (1928–2018), Canadian Progressive Conservative politician from Saskatchewan
Roy Bailey (footballer, born 1932) (1932–1993), English professional footballer
Roy Bailey (folk singer) (1935–2018), British socialist folk singer
Russ Bailey (1897–1949), American football center
Ruth Bailey (1913–1989), American actress
Ryan Bailey (water polo) (born 1975), American water polo player
Ryan Bailey (cricketer) (born 1982), South African cricketer
Ryan Bailey (rugby league) (born 1983), English rugby league footballer
Ryan Bailey (sprinter) (born 1989), American sprinter
Ryan C. Bailey (born 19??), American chemist

S
Sam, Samantha and Samuel Bailey (disambiguation), multiple people
Sam Bailey (born 1977), British singer, winner of the 2013 series of the UK's X Factor
Samantha Bailey (born 2001), American actress
Samuel Bailey (1791–1870), British philosopher and writer
 Sarah Bailey (born 1977), British Paralympian swimmer and cyclist now known as Dame Sarah Storey
Sarah Lord Bailey (1856–1922), elocutionist and teacher
Scott Bailey (disambiguation), multiple people
Scott Bailey (bishop) (1916–2005), bishop
Scott Bailey (curler) (born 1970), Canadian curler
Scott Bailey (ice hockey) (born 1972), ice hockey player
Scott Bailey (actor) (born 1978), American actor
Sean Bailey (disambiguation), multiple people
Sean Bailey (born 19??), American television and film producer
Sean Bailey (climber) (born 1996), American rock climber
Sean Bailey (sprinter) (born 1997), Jamaican springer
Sergio Bailey (born 1994), American football player
Shaun Bailey (disambiguation), multiple people
Shaun Bailey (London politician) (born 1971), a member of the London Assembly and former Conservative candidate for Mayor of London
Shaun Bailey (West Bromwich MP) (born 1992), Conservative Member of Parliament for West Bromwich West
Shaun Bailey (cricketer) (born 1990), player for Northamptonshire
 Sir Sidney Bailey (1882–1942), British Royal Navy Admiral
Simon Bailey (disambiguation), multiple people
Simon Bailey (priest) (1955–1995), Anglican priest and writer
Simon T. Bailey (born 1968), American speaker, author, life coach and entrepreneur
Simon Bailey (archivist) (born 19??), Keeper of the Archives at the University of Oxford in England
Sly Bailey, British newspaper executive
Solon Irving Bailey (1854–1931), American astronomer
Spencer Bailey (born c. 1986), American 3-year-old survivor of United Airlines Flight 232 air crash in 1989
Stacey Bailey (born 1962), American football player
 Sir Stanley Bailey (1926–2008), senior British police officer
Stanley John Bailey (1901–1980), British professor of law and legal writer
Stefan Bailey (born 1987), English footballer
Steve and Steven Bailey, multiple people
Steve Bailey (baseball) (born 1942), baseball player
Steve Bailey (born 1960), American bassist
Steven W. Bailey, American actor
Stuart Bertolotti-Bailey (born 1977), British graphic designer
Sydney D. Bailey (1916–1995), English author and pacifist

T
Tania Bailey (born 1979), British squash player
Tanya Bailey (born 1981), Australian BMX cyclist
Teddy Bailey (born 1944), American footballer
Temple Bailey (c. 1869 – 1963), American writer
Terry Bailey (born 1947), English footballer
Theodorus Bailey (disambiguation), multiple people
Theodorus Bailey (politician) (1758–1828), United States senator from New York
Theodorus Bailey (officer) (1805–1877), naval officer in the U.S. Civil War and the senator's nephew
Thomas Bailey (disambiguation), multiple people
Thomas Bailey (priest) (died 1657), 17th century religious controversialist
Thomas Bailey (topographer) (1785–1856), topographer and writer
Thomas P. Bailey (1867–1949), American educator
Thomas L. Bailey (1888–1946), American politician, Governor of Mississippi, 1944–1946
Thomas A. Bailey (1902–1983), historian and textbook author
Thomas H. Bailey (born 19??), American founder of mutual fund Janus
Thurl Bailey (born 1961), American basketball player
Tim Bailey (born 19??), Australian journalist, radio and TV presenter and sports reporter
Toby Bailey (born 1975), American sports agent and former basketball player
Toby Bailey (cricketer) (born 1976), English wicketkeeper
Tom Bailey (disambiguation), multiple people
Tom Bailey (footballer) (1888–after 1914), footballer who played for Lincoln City and Stoke
Tom Bailey (American football) (1949–2005), American football player
Tom Bailey (musician) (born 1956), English musician
Tom Bailey (author) (born 1961), American author and editor
Tom Bailey (cricketer) (born 1991), cricketer
Trevor Bailey (1923–2011), English cricketer, cricket writer and broadcaster
Trevor Bailey (rugby league) (born 1962), Australian rugby league footballer

V
Vernon Bailey (disambiguation), multiple people
Vernon Orlando Bailey (1864–1942), US naturalist
Vernon Howe Bailey (1874–1953), US artist and photographer
Victor Bailey (disambiguation), multiple people
Victor Albert Bailey (1895–1964), British-Australian physicist
Victor Bailey (musician) (1960–2016), American bass guitar player
Victor Bailey (American football) (born 1970), American football player
Brigadier General Vivian Bailey (1869–1938) Irish-born general in the British Army in the First World War

W
W. P. Bailey (fl.1864–1871), English cricketer
Warren Worth Bailey (1855–1928), American congressman from Pennsylvania
Wendell Bailey (born 1940), American congressman from Missouri
Wesley Bailey (1808–1889), American newspaper editor and 
Wilford S. Bailey (1921–2000), American academic administrator
Wilfrid Norman Bailey (1893–1961), British mathematician
Wilfred Bailey, 3rd Baron Glanusk (1891–1948), British peer and soldier
William Bailey (disambiguation), multiple people
William J. Bailey (1807–1876), British-born physician and politician in the Oregon Country
William Henry Bailey (1831–1908), American author, lawyer, and statesman
 Sir William Bailey (engineer) (1838–1913), British engineer, businessman, and local politician
William Francis Bailey (1842–1915), American politician and judge
William Trist Bailey (1846–1910), British-born American land developer
William Heap Bailey (1847–1926), British amateur footballer
William Bailey Lamar (1853–1928), American politician and lawyer
William Frederick Bailey (1857–1917), Irish lawyer and writer
William Bailey (cricketer, born 1870) (1870–1930), English cricketer
William Bailey (cricketer, born 1898) (1898–1983), Australian cricketer
William J. A. Bailey (1884–1949), Harvard University dropout who falsely claimed to be a doctor of medicine
William Bailey (actor) (1886–1962), American actor
William Bailey (cyclist) (1888–1971), British Olympic cyclist
William Bailey (Canadian politician) (1889–1975), member of the Legislative Assembly of Alberta, 1930–1935
William H. Bailey (artist) (1930–2020), artist
 William Bruce Bailey (born 1962), American rock singer-songwriter known as Axl Rose
Willie Bailey (born 1946), American politician in Mississippi

Z
Zac Bailey (born 1999), Australian rules footballer
Zack Bailey (born 1995), American football player

Fictional characters
Beetle Bailey, eponymous cartoon character of Mort Walker
Beth Bailey, fictional character from Spooks
George Bailey, lead character in the 1946 film "It's a Wonderful Life"
Harry Bailey (Coronation Street), fictional character from the British soap opera
June Bailey, fictional character from Wonder Park
Kelly Bailey (Misfits), fictional character from the British TV series Misfits
Miranda Bailey, fictional character from Grey's Anatomy
Rachel Bailey, fictional character from English TV show Scott and Bailey
 Sarah Bailey, a lead character in the film The Craft
Will Bailey, fictional character from The West Wing
 The Bailey family on Coronation Street, consisting of:
James Bailey
Ed Bailey
Michael Bailey
Aggie Bailey
Ronnie Bailey

See also
Bailey (disambiguation)
Baillie (surname)
Bailie (name)
Baily (surname)
Bayly (surname)
Bailey v. Alabama, a Supreme Court of the United States case which overturned the peonage laws of Alabama
Andy Bailey Provincial Park, in British Columbia, Canada
The Bill Bailey trilogy by Catherine Cookson
Carl Bailey Company Building, historic commercial building in North Little Rock, Arkansas
RNLB H F Bailey (disambiguation), several RNLI lifeboats
H. E. Bailey Turnpike, toll road in southwestern Oklahoma
Henry Bailey (sternwheeler), a sternwheel steamboat that operated on Puget Sound
Jonathan Bailey House (disambiguation), either of two buildings on the American Register of Historic Places
Justice Bailey (disambiguation)
Lea Bailey Light Railway, narrow gauge heritage railway in the United Kingdom
Lydia Bailey (novel), 1947 historical novel
Lydia Bailey, 1952 American film from the book of the same title
Port Bailey Seaplane Base, public seaplane base in the Kodiak Islands, Alaska
R. D. Bailey Lake, reservoir in West Virginia, USA
Sam Bailey Building, historic school building in Griffin, Georgia, U.S.
Scott & Bailey British detective drama series that debuted on ITV on 29 May 2011

References

English-language surnames
Surnames of English origin
Occupational surnames
English-language occupational surnames